Secondary college is the common name for government secondary schools in Victoria, Australia. The term arose through the reorganisation of the state government's high schools and technical schools from the late 1980s to mid-1990s, where most government secondary schools were renamed "secondary college". Some schools (such as Balwyn High School and Cobden Technical School) have retained their original names; others have changed their names from "secondary college" to "college" or, rarely, back to "high school".

References

Public high schools in Victoria (Australia)